Chane't Johnson (August 21, 1976 – December 2, 2010) was an American actress, director, producer and acting coach.

She appeared and guest starred in TV shows including Boston Public, Malcolm in the Middle, Without A Trace, LAX, Brothers and Life as well as directing and producing her own films and web series.

Life and career
Born A'Drewana Chane't Johnson in Dallas, Texas, Johnson received a BFA in Theatre Arts from Southern Methodist University. She went on to earn an MFA in acting from the University of California, San Diego.

Johnson started out as a stage actress. She was a trained Shakespearean actress and performed in more than fourteen productions of Shakespeare's plays during multiple seasons of the Dallas Shakespeare Festival.
In 2001, she was chosen for the role of Lena in the play Boesman and Lena, written and directed by South African playwright Athol Fugard.

As a television actress, Chane't had recurring guest-starring roles on shows such as Life, Day Break, LAX, Cold Case, Criminal Minds, Brothers, and Big Love.

She executive produced and starred in the web series, Nurses Who Kill... Her weekly web series Trailerate premiered in November 2009.

As an acting coach, she trained actors such as Denzel Whitaker (The Great Debaters, Training Day) and Nicole Travolta (The Secret Life of the American Teenager).

Johnson died from a heart attack in 2010.

Before her death, Johnson had increasingly been cast in feature films, playing opposite Rosanna Arquette, Tom Arnold, Ian Somerhalder and Bijou Phillips and was slated to produce and direct two feature horror/fantasy films, The Dark Sisters and Anomaly. She was the director of two short films, Texas Toast and Pony Man, which are set to play on the film festival circuit in 2011. Her short film First screened at the 2010 Newport Beach Film Festival.

Filmography

References

External links 
 
 Chane't Johnson Website
 Nurses Who Kill  Web series
 TRAILERRATE  Web series

1976 births
2010 deaths
Actresses from Dallas
Southern Methodist University alumni
American television actresses
American television producers
American television directors
University of California, San Diego alumni
American film actresses
American acting coaches
21st-century American actresses
American women television directors